Memoirs of a Broken Man is the 2009 debut album by Futures End. It is the band's first release, and features guest appearances from Nightmare Records president Lance King. The album was voted 'Best Progressive Metal Album of 2009' in USA Progressive Music Magazine's annual poll, beating fellow contestants Redemption, Shadow Gallery, Edgend, and Dream Theater.

Track listing
"Relentless Chaos" - 7:04
"Inner Self" - 7:01
"Endless Journey" - 4:29
"Your Decay" - 6:09
"Beyond Despair" - 5:29
"Share The Blame" - 5:55
"Forsaken" - 6:54
"Stand To Fall" - 6:44
"Terrors Of War" - 7:28
"Remembering Tomorrow" - 6:00
"Powerslave" (Iron Maiden cover) - 7:02

Personnel
 Fred Marshall - lead vocals
Marc Pattison – lead guitars, keyboard programming and sequencing
Christian Wentz – lead guitars, piano, keyboards
Steve DiGiorgio - bass
Jon Allen – drums
Lance King - guest vocals on "Inner Self"
Lucho Silva - guest vocals on "Forsaken" and "Relentless Chaos"

References

2009 albums
Futures End albums
Nightmare Records albums